Chen Shou-lum, CBE, JP (30 August 1925 – 27 August 2018) was a Hong Kong engineer, business executive and politician.

He was born and raised in mainland China. He studied engineering at the University of London and obtained a doctoral degree from the Chinese University of Hong Kong. He was the fellow of the Imperial College, University of London, Institution of Electrical Engineers and Hong Kong Institution of Engineers. He was elected as the president of the Institute of Engineers (was called Hong Kong Engineering Society by that time) in 1972.

He was also the director of several big corporations in the colony, such as the Hong Kong Electric Holdings Ltd., Cable & Wireless (Hong Kong) Ltd. and Hang Seng Bank Ltd. in the 1980s.

He came into politics when he was appointed to the Legislative Council of Hong Kong in 1976 and Executive Council in 1983. He resigned from the councils in 1987.

He also served in many public offices, serving as the chairman of the Hong Kong Productivity Council from 1977 to 1981, deputy chairman of the Hong Kong Polytechnic, chairman of the council of City Polytechnic of Hong Kong, and member of the university council of the Chinese University of Hong Kong.

He was made Justice of Peace, officer of the Order of the British Empire and commander of the Order of the British Empire in 1984. Chen died in August 2018, three days before his 93rd birthday.

References

1925 births
2018 deaths
Hong Kong engineers
Hong Kong businesspeople
Hong Kong justices of the peace
Members of the Executive Council of Hong Kong
Commanders of the Order of the British Empire
Alumni of the Chinese University of Hong Kong
Alumni of the University of London
HK LegCo Members 1985–1988